"Eva" is an Italian-language 1982 song by Umberto Tozzi. It was released as a double-A side with "Mama", and the success of both songs confirmed the singer's early popularity in Italy.

References

1982 singles
Umberto Tozzi songs
1982 songs